Putha Hiunchuli (Dhaulagiri VII) is a mountain in Nepal and part of the Dhaulagiri Range. It lies at the west end of the Dhaulagiri II chain and is 7246 meters high, making it the 95th highest mountain in the world. It was first climbed in 1954 by J. O. M. Roberts and Ang Nyima Sherpa.

References 

Seven-thousanders of the Himalayas
Mountains of the Karnali Province
Mountains of the Lumbini Province